Kalakankar is a village in Pratapgarh district of Indian state Uttar Pradesh.

Kalakankar was a zamindari in British India. The famous Hindi poet Sumitranandan Pant lived here.

References

Villages in Pratapgarh district, Uttar Pradesh